Events in the year 1027 in Norway.

Incumbents
 Monarchs – Olaf II

Events
Battle of Boknafjorden.
The king Olaf Haraldsson had the local powerful chieftain Erling Skjalgsson killed after the Battle of Boknafjorden. After this he lost his support, fled from the country to Russia the following year, and when he returned he was defeated in the Battle of Stiklestad in 1030.

Births

Deaths
21 December – Erling Skjalgsson, local chieftain, killed after a naval battle at Bokn.

References

Years of the 11th century in Norway
Norway
1027 in Europe